C81 or C-81 may refer to :
 C81 (album) (1981)
 C-81 (Michigan county highway)
 C-81 Reliant, a 1933 military aircraft
 Campbell Airport's FAA LID code
 Hodgkin's lymphoma's ICD-10 code
 NGC 6352's Caldwell catalog number
 Ruy Lopez's Encyclopaedia of Chess Openings code